Lowrey is an unincorporated community in Tehama County, in the U.S. state of California.

History
A variant name was "Lowrey's". A post office called Lowrey's was established in 1888, the name was changed to Lowrey in 1898, and the post office closed in 1917. The community was named after George M. Lowrey, a local cattleman.

References

Unincorporated communities in Tehama County, California